Trevor Wrensford, Jr.  is a US Virgin Islands soccer player, who currently plays as a midfielder for Raymix of the St. Thomas League, and the United States Virgin Islands national team.

Club career
Beginning in at least 2007, Wrensford was part of St Thomas/Trinity Strikers FC of the Saint Kitts Premier Division. In 2009, he was selected as part of the League XI representative team that season. Wrensford played for Raymix of the St. Thomas League beginning in at least 2009. He was still with Raymix in December 2015 as the team won its second straight St. Thomas Championship. During the final match of the season, Wrensford scored a goal as Raymix defeated Haitian Victory 3–2 to secure the title.

International career
Wrensford was raised on St. Kitts and Nevis but qualifies to represent the U.S. Virgin Islands through his father who is from Saint Thomas. In March 2016, Wrensford was named to the United States Virgin Islands squad for 2017 Caribbean Cup qualification. He made his international debut in the team's first match, an away fixture against Sint Maarten. He scored the game-winner of the 2–1 victory for his first international goal. He scored again in his second match, a 1–2 defeat to Grenada national football team, with USVI advancing to the second round despite the loss.

Career statistics

International 

Scores and results list United States Virgin Islands's goal tally first, score column indicates score after each Wrensford goal.

See also 
 List of top international men's football goalscorers by country

References

External links
 

1989 births
Living people
United States Virgin Islands soccer players
Association football forwards
Association football midfielders
United States Virgin Islands international soccer players